Tenali is a city in Guntur district of the Indian state of Andhra Pradesh. It is a municipality and the headquarters of Tenali mandal and Tenali revenue division. The city is renowned for art, culture, drama and hence, it is called Andhra Paris. It is one of the twelve urban local bodies in Andhra Pradesh Capital Region and the twelfth most populous city in the state, with a population of 199,345 as of 2011. Tenali City is also part of Andhra Pradesh Capital Region Development Authority (APCRDA).

Tenali Ramakrishna, one of the eight poets and jester of Maharaja Krishnadevaraya, hails from Tenali.

Etymology 
The word Tenali is derived from Teravali.

Three canals of the Krishna River flow through Tenali City, making it a part of the rice bowl of Andhra Pradesh, resembling Paris, where three canals pass through the city. Hence Tenali is affectionately called "Andhra Paris".

In 2011 the city limits were expanded by many kilometers. The expansion included the villages of Angalakuduru, Nandivelugu, Kolakaluru, Pinapadu, and Burripalem.

History 
The Andhra–Satavahana dynasty ruled the region around the present city from 225 B.C. to 225 A.D. The relics found in the excavations around Tenali reveal the existence of Jainism and Buddhism. One such example is the inscriptions in Ramalingeswara temple, dating back to the 16th century AD.

Geography 

It is also called as City without a National Highway. The East canal, the Nizampatnam canal and the West canal flow through the city, which originates from Krishna River. The region around the city forms a part of Western Delta System of Krishna river. The area is covered by Alluvium and the main soil varieties are Red and Black.

Climate

Tenali has a tropical wet and dry climate (Köppen Aw). May is the hottest and December is the coolest months of the year. The city receives maximum rainfall due to the onset of southwest monsoon season from June to October.

Demographics 

It comprises  males,  females and  children (age group of 0–6 years). The average literacy rate stood at 82.75% with  literates, of which males were 164,467 and females were 160,151. There are a total of  workers and  non–workers.

Language and religion 

Telugu is the most spoken language with a total of  native speakers, followed by  Urdu speakers. A significant minority speak Hindi, Marathi and Bengali. The religious population constitute  Hindus (83.76%),  Muslims (13.11%),  Christians (1.94%) and  (0.82%) not stating any religion.

Government and politics

Civic administration 

The Tenali Municipality is the seat of local government and the Tenali municipal council is the legislative body. It was constituted in 1909 and is classified as a special grade municipality. It has a total of 70 election wards: 27 unreserved and 43 reserved. The wards are reserved 4 for SCs, 12 for STs and 24 for BCs. Each ward is represented by a ward member and the wards committee is headed by a Chairperson. The present Municipal Commissioner of the city is Venkata Krishna. The municipality of the city has received several awards, such as the Green Leaf Award 2015 for Best Decentralised Solid Waste Management and Green City of the country for waste segregation management.

The city is represented by Tenali Assembly constituency in the state legislative assembly. The assembly segment forms a part of Guntur Lok Sabha constituency, which represents the lower house of Indian Parliament.

Public utilities 

The municipality oversees civic needs, such as water supply, sewerage, roads, and parks, and is included in the Atal Mission for Rejuvenation and Urban Transformation. The city residents rely on borewells, overhead reservoirs, and a filtration plant for daily water needs, which mainly draws water from the Krishna river of Prakasam Barrage. The city municipality implements two-bin garbage collection, sanitation campaigns like Mana Tenali – It's people's creation for hygiene of the people, ban on plastic bags etc.

Economy 

Tenali thrives on trade and agriculture. Irrigation in the Western Delta, the region in which the city lies, is supported by water from the Krishna river. Paddy is the major crop cultivated, producing on an average of 22–24 bags per acre. Major crops include black gram, maize, and jowar. The Tenali Agriculture Market Yard is used for trading and exporting agricultural products.

The city being a part of the capital region, is recognized as one of the future growth centers. It is also a part of the Tenali–Ponnur growth corridor.

Culture 

The city is notable for drama, fine arts, literature and poetry. The iconic Martyr's Memorial at Ranarang Chowk denotes the impact of the city on the Indian freedom struggle during the Quit India Movement. The people of Tenali had responded to Mahatma Gandhi's call and organised a bandh on 12 August 1942. The British police had opened fire on them, and seven people had been killed on the spot, at Morrispeta which later came to be known as Ranarang Chowk. After Independence, seven pillars had been erected in the memory of the seven martyrs, and a statue of Mother India with a baby in her arms had been installed at Ranarang Chowk.

It was the domicile of doyen of several social and revolutionary moments viz. Non Bramin Movement 1920 (Suryadevara raghavaiah Chowdary), Rationalist movement 1940 (Kaviraju Sri Tripuraneni), Radical Humanist Movement 1950 (Sri M.N. Roy) etc.

Drama and literature 
The city has been the host for events such as the formation of the 1929 Andhra Nataka Kala Parishad, the Kanyasulkam play, and cultural fests. Tenali Ramakrishna, one of the eight poets in the court of Sri Krishna Devaraya, hails from Tenali. In the area of modern literature are contributors such as Chakrapani, Gudipati Venkata Chalam, Kodavatiganti Kutumbarao, Tripuraneni Ramaswamy. Furthermore, Nethi Parameswara Sarma wrote the book Nurella Tenali Rangastala Charitra, which translates to 100 years of theater in Tenali.

Films 
Many artists who hail from Tenali and the nearby villages have contributed a major share to the Telugu film industry, such as AVS, Govindarajula Subba Rao (the first Telugu cinema hero), Krishna, Gummadi Venkateswara Rao, Jamuna, Kanchanamala (the first Telugu cinema heroine), Kongara Jaggayya, Rama Prabha, Savitri, Sharada, Siva Parvati and Divya Vani.

Cityscape 
There are various religious worship centers in the city, such as the Vaikuntapuram Venkateswara temple and the Iglesia ni Cristo church. The notable Satyanarayana UDA Lake Park (or Chinaravuru park), named after former municipal chairman Ravi Satyanarayana, is maintained by VGTMUDA (now APCRDA).

Transport 

Guntur, Mangalagiri, Burripalem and Ponnur roads are the arterial roads for road connectivity to the city. The road towards Guntur connects with SH 48 at Narakodur. The Tenali–Mangalagiri road, the Tenali–Narakodur road, and the Tenali–Chandole road are a part of the core road network of the district, which connects the city with Mangalagiri, Narakodur and Chandole respectively.

Bus and rail transport are the major modes of public transport for inter district and inter state commuting. The bus transport is provided by Tenali bus station, owned and operated by APSRTC. The station is also equipped with a bus depot for storage and maintenance of buses. It operates bus services to nearby and intrastate destinations.

The city has one of the largest railway station that is well connected to major cities like Guntur, Visakhapatnam, Vijayawada, Hyderabad, Chennai. As it is a junction railway station, the trains are more frequent to any of the cities.  provides rail connectivity to the city and is classified as an A–category station in the Vijayawada railway division of South Central Railway zone. It is an important junction station on the line between the Howrah–Chennai and the New Delhi–Chennai sections, which also connects the Tenali–Repalle branch line and the Guntur–Tenali section.

Education 

The primary and secondary school education is imparted by government, aided, and private schools, under the School Education Department of the state. As per the school information report for the academic year 2015–16, there are a total of 71 schools, comprising 26 private schools, 44 municipal schools, and 1 other type of school. The total number of students enrolled in primary, upper primary and high schools of the city is 11,544.

Adarsh Public School, Sharon Talent School St. John's Public School, Kendriya Vidyalaya, and Westberry School are some of the public and private schools under CBSE and state boards. Yalavarthy Veda Pathashala, one of the oldest vedic schools founded in 1894, is located in Gandhi Nagar area of the city.

There are 20 private aided junior colleges, such as the Taluk Junior college, the JMJ college for Women, the VSR and NVR college, and the Dr. B. R. Ambedkar Memorial Junior college. Additionally, fourteen unaided junior colleges provide undergraduate education. The JMJ college for women and the VSR and NVR college are the two autonomous colleges under Acharya Nagarjuna University. There are colleges for different fields of study, such as nursing, Government Industrial Training Institute, and other institutes for vocational courses.

Sports 

The city has an indoor sports complex for Badminton, Tennis and Volleyball at the Chenchupet area.

Sports personalities from the city include National Challengers Championship winner and chess master S. Ravi Teja and weightlifter Sai Revathi Ghattamaneni, a gold medalist at Senior Nationals in the 63-kg category.

Notable people
J. C. M. Sastry, nephrologist
Tenali Rama

Nadendla Bhaskara Rao,
Chief Minister of erstwhile Andhra Pradesh

Nadendla Manohar Speaker of erstwhile Andhra Pradesh

Super Star Krishna 
and Mahesh Babu Cine Heros of Telugu film

See also 
 List of cities in Andhra Pradesh
 List of municipalities in Andhra Pradesh
 List of villages in Guntur district

References 

 
Cities in Andhra Pradesh
Mandal headquarters in Guntur district
Cities in Andhra Pradesh Capital Region